The Roman Catholic Diocese of Kasese is a diocese in the city of Kasese in the ecclesiastical province of Mbarara in Uganda.

History
 6 March 1989: Established as the Diocese of Kasese separate from the Diocese of Fort Portal

Bishops of Kasese
 Egidio Nkaijanabwo (6 March 1989 – 15 April 2014)
 Acquirino Francis Kibira Araali (since 12 July 2014)

See also
Roman Catholicism in Uganda

References

External links
 GCatholic.org
 Catholic Hierarchy

Kasese District
Kasese
Christian organizations established in 1989
Kasese
1989 establishments in Uganda
Roman Catholic Ecclesiastical Province of Mbarara